The RBC Group, or RosBiznesConsulting, is a Russian media group headquartered in Moscow. It was established in 1993.
The company holds an informational agency RosBusinessConsulting, including a news web-portal, business newspaper , monthly business magazine RBC, and RBC TV.
Capitalization on MOEX is $44.13 million ( 10 March 2018).

History

RBC was recognized in Russia for investigative journalism, including reports on corruption and abuse of power which led to forced change of leadership, including the editor-in-chief Yelizaveta Osetinskaya, in May 2016. In April 2016, searches were conducted at the ONEKSIM Group investment fund, controlling shareholder of the RBC Group, due to publications about Vladimir Putin's daughter Katerina Tikhonova and her husband, Russian oligarch Kirill Shamalov, as well as about the Panama Papers. The Moscow Times reported that the 11 May 2016 RBC article "Oyster farming will begin in front of the "Putin's palace" near Gelendzhik" revealed that Alexander Ponomarenko is the owner of "Putin's Palace". The publishing of the RBC article contributed to Mikhail Prokhorov, who has the majority ownership of the RBK Group after he purchased a 51% stake in it in 2009, to fire Maxim Solus, the editor-in-chief of RBC newspaper, which further resulted in the resignations of both Roman Badanin, rbc.ru's chief editor, and Yelizaveta Osetinskaya, RBC's chief editor.

In September 2021, RBK Group sold 100% of shares of Ru-Center Group, the domain names registrar, to the syndicate of private investors, Ru-Web.Investments LLC, led by Proxima Capital Group (founded in 2013 by Vladimir Tatarchuk, ex-Alfa-Bank). RBK Group acquired 25% stake in Ru-Web.Investments LLC under the terms of the deal.

References

External links

  RBC Corporate Profile
  Official web site of RBC
  RBC Newspaper (former known as RBC Daily)
  RBC-TV
  Russian Google

1993 establishments in Russia
Mass media companies of Russia
Companies based in Moscow
Companies listed on the Moscow Exchange